Teenage Mutant Ninja Turtles is a 2013 video game published by Activision and developed by Magic Pockets, based on the 2012 Teenage Mutant Ninja Turtles TV series. It was the first video game to be based on the Nickelodeon show, featuring several villains from the show's first season. The digital versions of the game, alongside other Teenage Mutant Ninja Turtles games published by Activision, were pulled from all digital storefronts in January 2017 as they chose not to renew the license.

The Nintendo 3DS version was later bundled on a single cartridge with Teenage Mutant Ninja Turtles: Danger of the Ooze and was released as Teenage Mutant Ninja Turtles: Master Splinter's Training Pack on November 3, 2015, by Abstraction Games.

Reception 
The game was given generally unfavorable reviews by critics and fans. The Xbox 360 and Wii versions received very bad scores due to poor graphics, performance, and gameplay. The Nintendo 3DS version received slightly better review scores in regards to its graphics on the system, but was still criticized for repetitive and uninspired gameplay.

References

2013 video games
Activision games
Magic Pockets games
Video games based on Teenage Mutant Ninja Turtles
Video games set in New York City
Nintendo 3DS eShop games
Nintendo 3DS games
Wii games
Xbox 360 games
Multiplayer and single-player video games
Video games developed in France